Cagayan de Sulu Airport (Tausug: Landing sin Cagayan de Sulu)  is an airport serving the island municipality of Mapun (formerly named Cagayan de Sulu), Tawi-Tawi, Philippines. The Civil Aviation Authority of the Philippines classifies this facility as a community airport.

Though no airlines currently serve the airport, it sees some use by the military.

References

Airports in the Philippines
Buildings and structures in Tawi-Tawi
Transportation in Mindanao